Dmitry Yurievich Nazarov (born 4 July 1957) is а Soviet and Russian actor, television presenter and poet. People's Artist of Russia (2000).

He is an actor, known for Le Concert (2009), Largo Winch II (2011) and Yeltsin: Three Days in August (2011).

Supports Ukraine and opposes Russian invasion.

Early life
Dmitry Nazarov was born in Moscow, Soviet Union. In his youth he worked as a pastry chef at the bakery. In 1980 he graduated from the Mikhail Shchepkin Higher Theatre School (course Viktor Korshunov). In 1980 to 1995 he worked at the Maly Theater, then in the theater "Sphere" and the Theatre of the Russian Army, and since 2002 - in the Chekhov Moscow Art Theater.

Career

Between 2002 and 2008 Nazarov hosted the cooking show Culinary Duel on NTV. Host of the TVC inventor competition program Think Tank from the year 2009.

In the mystical series Call he played chief investigator Khromov, who specializes in mysterious crimes.

Since 2012, Nazarov has played the lead role of chef Viktor Barinov on the Russian comedy TV series Kitchen.

In 2013, he became the host of the Friday! show The Hunger Games. In 2014 he became a presenter of show Recipe for a Million on the STS channel. On September 5, 2015 has once again become the host of program Culinary Duel on the NTV channel.

Since the start of 2022 Russian invasion of Ukraine, Nazarov has criticized the war online. In January 2023, it was reported that Nazarov and his wife were fired by the Chekhov Moscow Art Theater for his anti-war views.

Awards and honours
In May 1993, he was awarded the honorary title of Merited Artist of the Russian Federation.

Winner of the Crystal Turandot Award for Best Actor in the 1997/1998 season, for Satin in the play TSATRA "The Lower Depths", Winner of the "Seagull" for the best actor of the season, "Mask of Zorro" (2005 play "The Forest"), the Icarus animation award in 2017.

In March 2000, he was awarded the honorary title of People's Artist of Russia. He received the Order of Friendship in 2008.

Personal life
He has one daughter with his first wife Natalia, one son and one daughter with his second wife, Russian actress Olga Vasilyeva.

Selected filmography

References

External links

 Dmitry Nazarov bio at Lifeactor.ru 

1957 births
20th-century Russian male actors
21st-century Russian male actors
Living people
Male actors from Moscow
Russian chefs
Russian male film actors
Russian male poets
Russian male stage actors
Russian male television actors
Russian male voice actors
Russian television presenters
Soviet male film actors
Soviet male stage actors
Soviet male television actors
Soviet male voice actors
Honored Artists of the Russian Federation
People's Artists of Russia
Russian activists against the 2022 Russian invasion of Ukraine